Restrictive dermopathy (RD) is a rare, lethal autosomal recessive skin condition characterized by syndromic facies, tight skin, sparse or absent eyelashes, and secondary joint changes.

Mechanism 
Restrictive dermopathy (RD) is caused either by the loss of the gene ZMPSTE24, which encodes a protein responsible for the cleavage of farnesylated prelamin A into mature non-farnesylated lamin, or by a mutation in the LMNA gene.  This results in the accumulation of farnesyl-prelamin A at the nuclear membrane.  Mechanistically, restrictive dermopathy is somewhat similar to Hutchinson–Gilford progeria syndrome (HGPS), a disease where the last step in lamin processing is hindered by a mutation that causes the loss of the ZMPSTE24 cleavage site in the lamin A gene.

Diagnosis

Treatment

See also 
 Relapsing linear acantholytic dermatosis
 List of cutaneous conditions
 Lamellar ichthyosis – Possible differential diagnosis

References

External links 

Autosomal recessive disorders
Genodermatoses
Progeroid syndromes
Rare diseases